Joshua David Fleming (born 29 June 1989) is an English former first-class cricketer.

Fleming was born at Crawley and later studied at Oxford Brookes University. While studying at Oxford Brookes, he made two appearances in first-class cricket for Oxford MCCU against Nottinghamshire and Worcestershire at Oxford in 2011 and 2012 respectively. He scored 30 runs in his two matches, with a high score of 13.

Notes and references

External links

1989 births
Living people
Sportspeople from Crawley
Alumni of Oxford Brookes University
English cricketers
Oxford MCCU cricketers